Grey Hosiery Mill, also known as Water Department-City of Hendersonville and Hold Hosiery, is a historic textile mill located at Hendersonville, Henderson County, North Carolina. It was built in 1915, with additions in 1919 and 1947.  It is a one-story, brick building with large multi-pane steel sash windows and stepped gable roof with clerestory.  The mill closed in 1967.

It was listed on the National Register of Historic Places in 2000.

References

Textile mills in North Carolina
Industrial buildings and structures on the National Register of Historic Places in North Carolina
Industrial buildings completed in 1915
Buildings and structures in Henderson County, North Carolina
National Register of Historic Places in Henderson County, North Carolina
Hendersonville, North Carolina